Norma Delia Orizi (18 August 1942 – 29 April 2014) known by her stage name Norma Pons, was an Argentine actress and vedette.

References

External links

1942 births
2014 deaths
20th-century Argentine actresses
21st-century Argentine actresses
Actresses from Rosario, Santa Fe
Argentine film actresses
Argentine stage actresses
Argentine television actresses
Argentine television personalities
Women television personalities
Argentine female dancers
Argentine vedettes
Argentine musical theatre actresses
Argentine musical theatre female dancers
Burials at La Chacarita Cemetery